Diamella kaszabi is a species of ground beetle in the Lebiinae subfamily that is endemic to the Taiwan (Formosa).

References

Beetles described in 1952
Beetles of Asia
Endemic fauna of Taiwan